Earl of Snowdon is a title in the Peerage of the United Kingdom. It was created in 1961, together with the subsidiary title of Viscount Linley, of Nymans in the County of Sussex, by Queen Elizabeth II for her then-brother-in-law, Antony Armstrong-Jones, who married Princess Margaret in 1960.

Titles

Choice of names
Snowdon, chosen for the earldom, had previously been used for a peerage title with royal associations. The title of Baron Snowdon had been conferred in 1726 along with the Dukedom of Edinburgh on Prince Frederick Louis, grandson of George I and future Prince of Wales. It merged in the Crown in 1760, when its holder acceded as George III.

Linley, chosen for the viscountcy, comes from the 1st Earl of Snowdon's maternal great-grandfather, the English cartoonist and illustrator Edward Linley Sambourne.

Nymans, chosen as territorial designation of the viscountcy, relates to an English garden near Handcross in West Sussex, where Anne Armstrong-Jones, née Messel, Countess of Rosse, mother of the 1st Earl of Snowdon, had grown up.

Life peerage
In November 1999, the 1st Earl of Snowdon received a life peerage as Baron Armstrong-Jones, under a device designed to allow first-generation hereditary peers to retain their seats in the House of Lords, after the passing of the House of Lords Act 1999.

Earls of Snowdon (1961)

  Antony Armstrong-Jones, 1st Earl of Snowdon (1930–2017)
  David Armstrong-Jones, 2nd Earl of Snowdon (born 1961)
(1) Charles Armstrong-Jones, Viscount Linley (b. 1999)

The heir apparent is the present holder's only son, Charles Armstrong-Jones, Viscount Linley (b. 1999). He is alone in the line of succession to the earldom.

Coats of arms

Notes

External links
 
 Cracroft's Peerage page

Earls of Snowdon
Earldoms in the Peerage of the United Kingdom
1961 establishments in the United Kingdom
Noble titles created in 1961